Stephan Kampwirth (born 20 March 1967) is a German theatre and screen actor.

Biography
Kampwirth graduated from Franz Stock High School in Arnsberg in 1986 and then did his civilian service as an ambulance driver in Munich. After training at the Hamburg drama studio from 1989 until 1992 under the direction of Hildburg Frese, Kampwirth worked at the Schiller Theater in Berlin, the Burgtheater in Vienna, and the Kammerspiele in Munich. He performed under the direction of Leander Haußmann, Dieter Dorn, Georg Ringsgwandl, and Helmut Griem.

His film and television career began in the early 1990s with smaller roles in television series such as Großstadtrevier, Wolffs Revier, and Tatort. He became known to a wider audience with the television miniseries Ein unmöglicher Mann and the film version of Amelie Fried's novel Der Mann von Nebenan, in which he played the role of Lukas Lander. Kampwirth has been part of the Hamburg Kammerspiele ensemble in his adopted home of Hamburg since 2007. From 2013 until 2015, he played Dr. Bode in the television series Lerchenberg.
Since 2017, Kampwirth has held one of the lead roles in the Netflix science fiction series Dark, that of Peter Doppler.

Selected filmography

Film

Television

Awards
 Bavarian Art Award in the field of "performing arts" (1998)
 "Expression en corto" festival, "Best Actor" for Die Überraschung (2005)
 "Concorto" festival, short film category, "Best Actor" for Die Überraschung (2006)
 Rolf Mares Prize, Outstanding Performance Actor/Singer/Dancer category, for the portrayal of Sebastian in Wir lieben und wissen nichts at the Hamburg Kammerspiele (2013)

References

External links

 
 Stephan Kampwirth at filmportal.de
 Stephan Kampwirth at Lambsdorff talent agency

1967 births
Living people
German male film actors